Tobias "Toby" Gad (born 28 March 1968) is a Los Angeles-based German music producer/songwriter, best known for co-writing John Legend's biggest hit, "All of Me," the fifth-highest certified single in RIAA history, and for co-writing and producing "Big Girls Don't Cry" by Fergie and "If I Were a Boy" by Beyoncé. Other notable works include "Skyscraper" for Demi Lovato, "Who You Are" for Jessie J, "Untouched" for The Veronicas, "A Year Without Rain" for Selena Gomez & the Scene, "Don't Hold Your Breath" for Nicole Scherzinger, "Love You More" for JLS, and "I Do" for Colbie Caillat.

In the third quarter of 2014, Gad was ranked the #3 songwriter in America by Billboard, behind Ryan Tedder and Pharrell Williams.

Biography

Childhood and early musical experience
Born into a musical family in Munich in 1968, Gad was influenced by both parents who were established figures in the Munich music scene with their group, The Jazz Kids. His Danish father is a clarinet player and a pilot. His German mother is a psychotherapist and composer/pianist who tours the UK and Europe with Brian Carrick's jazz band, the Algiers Stompers.

Gad was expected to study banjo and join the Jazz Kids, but he took to playing the piano instead. At age 7, he and his brother Jens had formed their own band, the Gad Rollers, and played original rock'n'roll compositions during intermissions of their parents' gigs.

Early career successes
Although too young to get into most clubs at age 13, Toby and Jens were no strangers to the live music scene in Munich. Weekly gigs in bars, concerts in open-air summer festivals and shows in legendary live clubs such as the Domicile spread the word, and Munich hit producer Tony Monn showed interest in the brothers. Monn handed over his state-of-the-art recording studio to Toby and Jens whenever he was out of town. Monn's generosity provided a learning environment for Toby and Jens to delve into songwriting and producing.

In 1986, when Frank Farian, a multi-platinum German producer (No Mercy, Boney M, Milli Vanilli) was looking for new talent, a mutual friend turned him on to the Gad brothers' material. The next day, the boys flew to Frankfurt and thus started a seven-year collaboration with Farian. One week later, they found three of their songs on Milli Vanilli's debut album, which later went multi-platinum.

Farian produced Toby and Jens' first album Q' as artists', which was followed by a live tour. Funk legend George Clinton would later hear the record and invited Toby and Jens to perform two songs on stage with his P-funk band.

Commercial breakthrough
In 1990, Toby Gad met Mauritian singer Jacqueline Nemorin. This became the beginning of a 10-year collaboration between the two. Together with Farian, Gad produced Nemorin's first album The Creole Dance on BMG.

In 1994, Gad signed on with manager Klaus Frers (Daydream Music Supervizing) and produced Nemorin's second album for EMI Europe. It was also Frers who moved the duo into music production for dozens of successful TV shows, commercials and movie soundtracks. Gad and Nemorin wrote and produced the title-song for the movie Neverending Story III, the music for two popular daily TV talk-shows that stayed on air for four years, and the single "The Magic of the Fall", which went on to win the BDA Gold Award in L.A. for best TV trailer concept. In 1998, Gad was hired by Spanish producer Rafael Perez to work on Enrique Iglesias' third album. That same year, Gad signed a deal with Joost Van Os, former head of Polygram.

Move to New York City
Following much success in his home country, Gad relocated to New York City, opening Strawberrybee studio in Midtown Manhattan. The album title song and hit single "Unspoken" of Christian platinum artist Jaci Velasquez, written by Gad, Madeline Stone and O.Hatch, managed to stay half a year in the Christian Billboard top 20 single charts and was re-released on the Billboard #2 album, WOW Greatest Hits 2004.

Meanwhile, Gad had several successes back overseas. "Damn I Think I Love You" stayed at #1 for seven weeks and became the most sold single of 2001 in the Netherlands. The #1 StarMaker album with two of Gad's songs went triple platinum. Sita's debut single "Happy" was at #1 for two weeks and remained in the top five for two months. The song was also released in the US on the Wild Thornberries soundtrack, followed by the #1 album of Sita.

Success in America
After 3 years in New York without any success, Gad was given the chance to work with MTV host Willa Ford. Their single "A Toast to Men" became a #40 radio single, appearing in the hit movie Barbershop 2.

Gad, with David and William Derella from DAS, worked out a co-publishing deal with Cherrylane Music Publishing and record deals for several of Gad's artists. In August 2005, Interscope Records released Texan teen Kaci Brown's album Instigator, entirely developed, produced and co-written by Gad. R&B group Fatty Koo has an album on Columbia Records on which every song is produced and co-written by Toby. He produced and co-wrote songs on the album of the Australian twins The Veronicas, who scored the biggest US newcomer record deal of the year on Warner Bros. Records/Sire Records and went double platinum in Australia.

Meleni and Gad co-wrote the song "Drop It On Me" on Ricky Martin's 2005 album Life. Another artist that Toby developed for years, Lola, released her single "No Strings" on Warner Bros. Records/Sobe, which spent 4 months on the Billboard Dance charts, peaking at #2.

In 2006, Gad opened a second studio with five interns, expanding his production company Strawberrybee Music and his publishing company, Gad Songs. Gad produced the entire Blue Note Records album of Elizabeth Withers, who starred in the Broadway musical The Color Purple, and contributed a song on Fergie's platinum-selling album The Dutchess. He also collaborated with then 13-year-old Emmy nominated actress/singer Keke Palmer on her 2007 debut album on Atlantic Records and produced a song for the second season of hit Disney sitcom Hannah Montana.

As an innovative producer and songwriter, Gad has been interviewed multiple times about how he writes and how he records and mixes using Logic Pro.  He has been featured in Mix Magazine, the Recording Mag, Pro Sound and more.

In 2008, Gad and Fergie's "Big Girls Don't Cry" was Grammy nominated for Best Female Vocal Performance and won ASCAP 'Song of the Year'. The song twice broke the record for most airplay on US radio and spent a total of 21 weeks in various Billboard US charts at #1, including one week #1 on the Billboard Hot 100. Over 87 worldwide compilation albums feature the song. Gad scored his second worldwide #1 hit with Beyoncé's "If I Were a Boy", which Gad produced and co-wrote. "If I Were A Boy" reached #1 in nine countries and hit top-ten in over 20 countries around the world. Gad's third platinum number one hit was the indie-electro pop anthem "Untouched" by Aussie duo The Veronicas. The song sold platinum in the US and reached #1 in Ireland and Mexico.

Move to Los Angeles
In summer 2009, Gad relocated his recording studio to Los Angeles. The new studio, located in the Hollywood Hills, features several music production rooms and a video editing room. In Los Angeles, Gad continued collaborating with stars such as American Idol finalists Kris Allen, Allison Iraheta and Jessica Sanchez.

In 2009, Gad also launched his own record label, Kite Records, which is a collaboration between himself, David Sonenberg/DAS Management, and Island Def Jam Music Group as well as Gad Films which features exclusive behind the scenes footage of Gad working in the studio with stars such as Miley Cyrus and The Veronicas. In 2011, Gad co-wrote "All of Me" for John Legend, which, after three years of dormancy made its way to #1 on the Top 100 for three weeks and was certified 14 times platinum, making it the highest certified track in RIAA history (tied with "Despacito").

In 2014, Gad co-wrote 11 songs with Madonna for her album Rebel Heart, producing four of the songs.

In 2015, Gad executive produced and co-wrote much of Leona Lewis' fifth studio album, I Am.  He co-wrote and produced Prince Royce's "Lucky One" on Double Vision, co-wrote John Newman's "I'm Not Your Man" from Revolve, and co-wrote and produced "First Heartbreak" for Grammy-nominated artist Tori Kelly's Unbreakable Smile. Gad also produced and co-wrote the international charity single "Love Song to the Earth" which featured a long list of popular artists, including Paul McCartney, Fergie, Jon Bon Jovi, Sheryl Crow, Sean Paul, Nicole Scherzinger, and more.  He also produced the 2015 album of Chloe Temtchine, Be Brave, which was described by the New York Post as "a moving collection of pop songs that document her struggle for survival, but also her recovery."

Single peak positions

U.S. Billboard Hot 100 Entries 
The following singles written and/or produced by Toby Gad charted on the Billboard Hot 100:

All Time Hits 
The following singles appear on the US Billboard Year-End or All-Time Hits charts:

UK single peaks 
The following singles charted inside the top 40 of the UK Download or UK Singles Chart:
 "If I Were a Boy" by Beyonce - #1 (2008)
 "Don't Hold Your Breath" by Nicole Scherzinger - #1 (2011)
 "Big Girls Don't Cry" by Fergie - #2 (2007)
 "All of Me" by John Legend - #2 (2013)
 "Skyscraper" by Sam Bailey - #1 (2013)
 "Love You More" by JLS - #1 (2010)
 "Skyscraper" by Demi Lovato - #17 (2011)
 "Who You Are" by Jessie J - #8 (2011)
 "Untouched" by The Veronicas - #8 (2007)
 "Living for Love" by Madonna - #26 (2014)
 "Up" by James Morrison & Jessie J - #30 (2011)
 "Fire Under My Feet" by Leona Lewis - #26 (2015)

RIAA certifications

Discography

References

External links

Profile, discogs.com
Profile, atlasmusicgroup.com
Profile, idolator.com
Profile, complex.com

Profile, ascap.com
Profile, observer.com 
Speaker, ascap2012.sched.org 
Atlantic Music Signs Grammy Award winner Toby Gad, broadwayworld.com
Toby Gad discography, board.thenext2shine.com 
Toby Gad with new top releases, bmg.com
Toby Gad/John Legend interview, songwriteruniverse.com

Living people
1968 births
German songwriters
German emigrants to the United States
Musicians from Munich